Casco Histórico de Vallecas is a ward (barrio) of Madrid belonging to the district of Villa de Vallecas.

Wards of Madrid
Villa de Vallecas